Robert Fellowes may refer to:

Robert Fellowes, Baron Fellowes (born 1941), former Private Secretary to Elizabeth II
Robert Fellowes (philanthropist) (1771–1847), English philanthropist

See also
Robert Fellows (1903–1969), American film producer